4Q448, often called the "Hymn to King Jonathan," is a piece of parchment from among the Dead Sea Scrolls, found in Cave 4, containing two separate short works, part of Psalm 154 and a prayer mentioning a King Jonathan (Yəhōnatan).

The only King Jonathan in early Jewish history was Alexander Jannaeus ("Jannaeus" being an abbreviated form of "Jonathan") and it is widely believed that this was the King Jonathan of 4Q448, though some doubt has been raised over the identification.

The first column of the prayer may read:

1 "the holy city,
2 for Jonathan the king
3 and all the congregation of your people
4 Israel
5 which have been dispersed to the four
6 winds of the heavens
7 let peace be on all of them
8 and your kingdom"
9 "And may your name be praised"

Others translate the first line quite differently:

"Arise O Holy One"

If this text does in fact portray Alexander Jannaeus in a favorable light, it discounts his identification as the Wicked Priest, a figure mentioned in other scrolls. For the reading that the text is *against* Alexander Jannaeus, according to K. Penner, E. Main, A Lemaire, D. Harrington and J. Strugnell, G. Lorein, and S. Goranson, with bibliography, see Goranson in the references.

Footnotes

References
 Eshel, E., Eshel, H., Yardeni, A., "A Qumran Composition Containing part of Ps. 154 and a Prayer for the Welfare of King Jonathan and his Kingdom", ''IEJ' 42 (1992) 199–229.
 Goranson, S. *"Jannaeus, His Brother Absalom, and Judah the Essene,"

Dead Sea Scrolls
1st-century BC manuscripts
Hebrew manuscripts